
Kurt Haertel (26 September 1910, Berlin – 30 March 2000, Seefeld am Ammersee) was a German patent lawyer. He played a leading role in the establishment of the European patent system. He is sometimes referred to as one of the "fathers of the European patent law", or the "father of European patent law". He was President of the Deutsches Patent- und Markenamt (German Patent and Trade Mark Office) from 1963 to 1975. In October 1977, he was elected Honorary Chairman of the Administrative Council of the European Patent Organisation.

Since 2003, a street in Munich, Germany, is named after him, the "Kurt-Haertel-Passage". This is the connecting path from the Grasserstraße to the Bayerstraße near the buildings of the European Patent Office.

Publications 

 Die Rückgliederung des Saarlandes auf dem Gebiet des gewerblichen Rechtsschutzes, des Wettbewerbsrechts und des Urheberrechts, GRUR 1957, 98 (with Albrecht Krieger)
 The New European Patent System, Its Present Situation and Significance, (Dec. 1978) I.I.C., Vol. 19, No.6

See also 

 Romuald Singer
 Dieter Stauder
 Johannes Bob van Benthem

References

External links
  Kurt-Haertel-Institut für geistiges Eigentum an der FernUniversität in Hagen (English: Kurt Haertel Institute of Hagen University)
 IP Hall of Fame, . Archived on archive.org.

1910 births
2000 deaths
20th-century German lawyers
Knights Commander of the Order of Merit of the Federal Republic of Germany